Amelia Vargas (January 16, 1928 in Havana – April 21, 2019 in Buenos Aires) was a Cuban actress and dancer.  She mainly worked in Argentina.  She starred in the 1950 film Arroz con leche under director Carlos Schlieper.

Selected filmography
 The Phantom of the Operetta (1955)
 Cleopatra Was Candida (1964)

References

External links
 
 

Cuban film actresses
Cuban emigrants to Argentina
Argentine film actresses
Argentine people of Cuban descent
Cuban female dancers
1928 births
2019 deaths
20th-century Cuban actresses
20th-century Argentine actresses